Bienosaurus (meaning "Bien's lizard") is a genus of thyreophoran dinosaur from the Lower Jurassic (probably Sinemurian) Lower Lufeng Formation in Yunnan Province in China.

Discovery and species 
 
In 1938, Bian Meinian, known in the West as Mei Nien Bien, discovered a fragmentary dinosaur skull. In 2001, Dong Zhiming named and described the specimen as the type species Bienosaurus lufengensis. The generic name honours Bian. The specific name refers to the Lufeng formation.

Bienosaurus is based on holotype IVPP V15311 (in 2001 incorrectly given the inventory number IVPP V 9612). It consists of a partial right lower jaw with teeth and several cranial fragments.

Phylogeny 
Dong in 2001 placed Bienosaurus in the Scelidosauridae, considering these to be part of the Ankylosauria. Later publications suggested a general position basal in the Thyreophora. In 2019 a study confirmed this, concluding Bienosaurus was a nomen dubium, possibly identical to Tatisaurus from the same formation.

See also 

 Timeline of ankylosaur research

References 

Thyreophorans
Sinemurian life
Early Jurassic dinosaurs of Asia
Jurassic China
Fossils of China
Paleontology in Yunnan
Fossil taxa described in 2001
Taxa named by Dong Zhiming
Ornithischian genera